Eucithara moraria is a small sea snail, a marine gastropod mollusk in the family Mangeliidae.

Description
The shell length attains 9 mm; its diameter 3.5 mm.

(Original description) The shell is small and subcylindrical. Its colour is blackish brown, the apex and bands on the lip  are buff. The shell contains  7 whorls, the upper short, well rounded, the last flatter, half the length of the shell. Sculpture:— Riblets are set at the rate of about eighteen to a whorl, more than the breadth of each apart, incurved at the suture, those above more prominent, on the body whorl decreasing in height, and gradually vanishing on the base. Both riblets and intercostal spaces are closely encircled by alternately larger and smaller threads, which are in turn grained by finer radial lines. The aperture is narrow. It has a well developed external varix, slightly incised by a posterior notch. Within the outer lip are a few small denticules, and on
the inner lip fourteen short entering ridges.

Distribution
This marine genus is endemic to Australia and occurs off Queensland.

References

  Tucker, J.K. 2004 Catalog of recent and fossil turrids (Mollusca: Gastropoda). Zootaxa 682:1-1295.

moraria
Gastropods described in 1922